Béchara Abou Mrad, B.S.O., (19 May 1853 – 22 February 1930) was a Melkite priest and monk He is venerated by the Catholic Church especially in Melkite Greek Catholic Church, having been declared Venerable by Pope Benedict XVI.

Early life 
He was born on 19 May 1853 at Zahleh, Al Beqaa’, Lebanon. His birth name was Selim Jabbour Abou-Mourad. His Mother's name was Elisabeth Al-Kach or (Ash).

Religious life 
He entered St. Savior's Monastery on 5 September 1874. He entered the novitiate of the Basilian Salvatorian Order on 19 September 1874. He took the name 'Béchara' meaning "Good News" as his religious name.

Took his vows on 4 November 1876. He was ordained deacon on 26 March 1882 in the chapel of Holy Savior Seminary by Msgr. Basilios Hajjar.

Monk Béchara was ordained to the priesthood on 26 December 1883 in the Church of Holy Savior Monastery by Msgr. Basilios Hajjar.

He worked as Director of Discipline, confessor and spiritual director in the seminary of the Salvatorian Fathers. Between 8 November 1891, and 4 December 1922, he served as itinerant missionary in the district of Deir-el-Qammar, Mount Lebanon.

He served as a parish priest and confessor at Sidon Cathedral in South Lebanon from 4 December 1922 till 1 February 1927.

Death 
He died on 22 February 1930 at the Holy Savior Monastery, near Sidon.

Funeral service and burial were celebrated at the Holy Savior Church. He is buried at the Holy Saviour Church, Sidon Al-Janub, Lebanon.

Cause of beatification and canonization 
Pope Benedict XVI issued a decree on Saturday, 11 December 2010, naming Monk Béchara as Venerable among others.

References

Venerated Catholics by Pope Benedict XVI
1853 births
1930 deaths
Melkite Greek Catholic Church
Salvatorians
Lebanese Christian monks
People from Zahle
19th-century Christian monks
20th-century Christian monks